Skypoint is a tent-like structure over the intersection of 2nd Avenue and Broadway in downtown Billings, Montana, USA. There are three "sails" that make up the structure. The largest sail can move to let the sun through or to cover the intersection if it rains. Skypoint is part of the plan to revitalize downtown Billings and attract more people to downtown.

Skypoint was completed in 2002 and was originally named the "Defining Element" until it got its current name in a naming contest. It was built as a new icon for the city of Billings and to hold events such as the Strawberry festival, the Christmas Stroll, and other events.

Structure statistics 
Tallest column: 
2 Shortest columns: 
Sails: 3
Completed: April 2002
Dedicated: May 2002

References 

Landmarks in Montana
Buildings and structures in Billings, Montana
Buildings and structures in Montana